Lyonetia probolactis is a moth in the  family Lyonetiidae. It is known from Mahé and Silhouette islands in the Seychelles.

This species has a wingspan of 9–10 mm – head, palpi, antennae and thorax are silvery with, crown smooth. Cilia are pale grey.

References

Lyonetiidae